Lawrence "Larry" Bagneris Jr. (born September 15, (1946), is an American social and political activist from New Orleans, Louisiana. Bagneris’ career has focused on improving government relations with the African American and LGBT communities. Bagneris served as the executive director of the City of New Orleans Human Relations Commission from 1999 to 2018.

Early life
Larry Bagneris is the son of Gloria Diaz Bagneris and Lawrence Bagneris Sr., who had four children. Bagneris' brother, Vernel Bagneris, is an actor, playwright and musician. His father was a postal clerk and a veteran who served during World War II. Bagneris’ mother was the manager of the Bagneris house.

Bagneris and his family initially resided in the Creole Seventh Ward neighborhood of New Orleans. Due to a U.S. Federal program of "Urban Renewal" of the 1960s, the Bagneris family relocated to the Gentilly neighborhood of New Orleans. The program was referred to as "The Negro Removal," which saw the creation of a highway overpass through the community that invited crime and drove down the spirits of property of the Seventh Ward.

Bagneris and his brother attended St. Augustine High School in New Orleans. It was at St. Augustine that Larry began to become interested in political activism.

Early activism
Bagneris' first involvement in racial activism was at the age of 16. He participated in picketing Maison Blanche Department Stores in New Orleans for their usage of Jim Crow style policies. The pickets that Larry participated in eventually led to sit-in protests. Bagneris was arrested at sit-ins at FrosTop, Walgreens and Woolworth's. Because he was only sixteen when these events occurred, he was only held as a juvenile.

While in high school, Bagneris participated in the 1963 Nation Conference for International Justice in Memphis, Tennessee with faculty and students from St. Augustine High School.

References

1946 births
Living people
American political activists
American social activists
People from New Orleans
Xavier University alumni
Louisiana Democrats